Semeyka is a rural locality (a selo) and the administrative center of Semeyskoye Rural Settlement, Podgorensky District, Voronezh Oblast, Russia. The population was 325 as of 2010. There are 3 streets.

Geography 
Semeyka is located 35 km southeast of Podgorensky (the district's administrative centre) by road. Saprino is the nearest rural locality.

References 

Rural localities in Podgorensky District